Pennyman may refer to:
 Mary Pennyman (1631–1701), English religious polemicist
 John Pennyman (1628–1706), Quaker schismatic and husband of Mary
 Pennyman baronets, holders of one of two baronetcies created for members of the Pennyman family
 Sir William Pennyman, 1st Baronet (1607–1643), English landowner, soldier, and politician
 Sir James Pennyman, 6th Baronet (1736–1808), British politician